Shaikh Burhanuddin Post Graduate College is prominent and old university college in old Dhaka. 
Neda-e-Islam established Shaikh Burhanuddin Post Graduate College in 1965 at 50,Narinda, 
Dhaka after the demise (9 May 1964) of the Great Reformer Imaamut Tareeqat Allama Shaykh 
Sayyid Muhammad Burhanuddin Uwaysi (Rad.) to commemorate his holy name. From the year 1949 Imaamut Tareeqat (Rad.) 
established and run successfully twenty Institutions in his lifetime, and Shaikh Burhanuddin College 
is the 21st institution of Neda-e-Islam. Later, it was shifted to 60,Nazimuddin Road, 
Dhaka (Old Radio Broadcasting Center) on 8 February 1968. To implement Article 3(C) of the Memorandum 
of Neda-e-Islam to precipitate the needed Islamic Spiritual Reformed Environment in General and Modern Education, 
it is absolutely free from student politics as the founder organization Neda-e-Islam is absolutely non-political.

Department of Science

 Computer Science & Engineering
 Environmental Science
 Psychology

Department of Arts
 Anthropology
 English
 Bangla
 Economics
 Social work
 Political Science

HSC
 Business Studies
 Science Discipline
 Arts Discipline

See also
 Dhaka College

References

External links
 http://www.sbpgc.edu.bd

Universities and colleges in Dhaka
1965 establishments in East Pakistan
Educational institutions established in 1965
Colleges in Dhaka District